Zgoda may refer to the following places:
Zgoda, Kuyavian-Pomeranian Voivodeship (north-central Poland)
Zgoda, Gmina Łanięta in Łódź Voivodeship (central Poland)
Zgoda, Gmina Żychlin in Łódź Voivodeship (central Poland)
Zgoda, Łowicz County in Łódź Voivodeship (central Poland)
Zgoda, Lublin Voivodeship (east Poland)
Zgoda, Subcarpathian Voivodeship (south-east Poland)
Zgoda, Greater Poland Voivodeship (west-central Poland)
Zgoda, Warmian-Masurian Voivodeship (north Poland)
Zgoda, West Pomeranian Voivodeship (north-west Poland)
 Zgoda, Swiętochłowice in Silesian Voivodeship (south Poland)
Zgoda labour camp, Silesia (south Poland)

See also